Jolicoeur is a surname. Notable people with the surname include:

Allyson Jolicoeur (born 1982), Mauritian football player
Aubelin Jolicoeur (1925–2005), Haitian journalist who frequented Haïti's Hotel Oloffson for 40 years
Barnabe Jolicoeur (born 1966), former Mauritian sprinter at the 1996 Summer Olympics
David Jude Jolicoeur (1968–2023), American rapper, producer, and one third of groundbreaking hip hop trio De La Soul
Paul Jolicoeur (born 1945), Québécois professor and doctor
Robert Jolicoeur (born 1948), Canadian landscape architect, designer of FEI international equestrian show jumping courses

See also
Jolicoeur (Montreal Metro), station on the Green Line of the Montreal Metro rapid transit system
JellyCar
Jolie Kerr
Julie Carr